Christ Church School is a private coeducational prep school located in Mumbai, India. It is a Christian school, founded in 1815, under the auspices of the Bombay Education Society. It has close to 3800 students, all of whom are night scholars. The school is twinned with Barnes School, in Deolali, Nashik. Both schools follow the ICSE curriculum. It is located in Byculla, just ahead of the JJ flyover. The school is located on Clare Road, or as it is locally called, Mirza Ghalib Marg.

History 
In the early 1700s, the Rev. Richard Cobbe was appointed chaplain to the British East India Company's Factory in Bombay. In 1718, he founded a small school where twelve poor boys were given free housing, clothing, food, and education. The school, which had one teacher, was located in a building not far from the present-day Cathedral of St. Thomas in Fort, Mumbai.

After nearly a century, the Ven. Archdeacon George Barnes, also with the East India Company, realised that the original school could not possibly meet the needs of hundreds of children it then looked after. He appealed for funds, and started the Bombay Education Society in 1815. The original school was taken over by the BES, and numbers grew rapidly until it was apparent that new grounds and school buildings were essential. A large site at Byculla was given by the Government for the building of the school, and the new school buildings were opened in 1825. One of the copper plates commemorating the opening is on the wall of Evan's Hall in Barnes School, while the other remains with Christ Church School.

The parish church Christ Church, Byculla was later built on part of the land given originally to the BES, and remains there to this day. Much of the original land was later sold to help in the building of Barnes, which was established in 1925 as a school for boarders. The BES schools, as they were popularly known, were primarily boarding schools for Anglo-Indian boys and girls, mainly belonging to the Anglican Church. However, day-scholars were later admitted, and they were of all castes and creeds. In the early 1900s, the BES merged with the Indo British institution which had been founded by Rev. George Candy, in 1837. In 1925, two new schools were established - one for day-students only (Christ Church School), and one for boarders and day-students (Barnes School).

Campus and facilities
The school is spread across a large campus. The main building is a long, three-storey structure which houses the 1st to 10th grade classes, the ISC classes, the IGCSE classrooms as well as the science laboratories, teacher's rooms and administration offices.

At the other end of the school stands a fourteen-storey building which houses the kindergarten classes, and staff quarters, along with the woodwork room. This building also houses the music room. In between the two buildings lie a hall (used for morning assembly and school functions), a tennis lawn, a basketball court, and a children's playground. The school has a sports field, which is used for its sports activities, as well as for athletics.

School features 
The school follows the ICSE course syllabus, as set out by the ICSE board in Delhi.

It runs classes from kindergarten to the 10th grade, with each grade being divided into four divisions (A to D). The average class consists of 25 students in kindergarten, and increases to an average of 45 students per class in the 10th grade.

The students are divided among four houses, and compete through the year in extracurricular activities: 
 Barnes (red)
 Heber (green)
 Malcolm (blue)
 Willoughby (yellow)

Students called Prefects are appointed by the school to perform duties like monitoring classes when there is no teacher in the class or being involved in flag hoisting during Independence Day. They wear a coloured tie of their house. The main prefects are the head boy and the head girl. There are also house captains for each house, who are the secondary head of each house. The primary head of each house are the 'house presidents', who are one of the teachers.

From 2008, Christ Church has introduced a junior college. This college is one of the few ISC colleges in Mumbai, with courses in arts, science and commerce. The college is up till Std. 12.

Uniform 
Kindergarten students wear Persian coloured checked shorts, and a Persian blue shirt attached to the shorts, while girls wear Persian blue dress.

Boys, up to the 7th grade, wear white shorts, white half-sleeved shirts, school belt, black shoes, and the school tie (which is dark bottle green with a thin yellow stripes running diagonally). The students usually pin a badge of their house name (and the house colour on the background) to their tie or their pockets.

From the 8th grade onwards, boys wear full white trousers, a white half- sleeved shirt, the green and yellow striped school belt with school logo in the middle, black shoes, and the school tie. Girls wear a belted all-white dress, with the same tie as boys (for all grades). The college boys wear a deep green full pant and a shirt which has a yellow coloured logo of the school on the pocket. The tie stripes are of a little lighter colour than that of the other students. The college girls wear a deep green skirt and a bow tie of the same colour.

On days when students have Physical Education (PE) training, the boys wear a white collared T-shirt,  with the collar and sleeves being in the colour of their House. Girls wear a similar T-shirt, with a house-coloured skirt, with house-coloured shorts underneath. Both girls and boys wear white canvas shoes and socks (with two circular bands on the socks representing their house colour) on these days.

Faculty 
There is a 16:1 student to teacher ratio. Some of the faculty live on campus, in apartments located in a building which also house the kindergarten school classes. The apartment is located at one end of the school field. Each teacher is affiliated to a house, and each house has a House President for the girls and boys respectively. As part of their House duties, teachers oversee the selection and training of students for participation in inter-house activities. Most of the training is done by the Captain and vice captain of the house.

Heads of Staff 
 Principal : Mr. F. Bunyan 
 Vice-Principal: Mr. Graham Heiden.
 Junior school Headmistress : Mrs. W. Rodriques
 ISC Coordinators: Mr. Joe Rose 
 Cambridge Coordinator: Ms. A. Luke
 Senior School Coordinator: Mr. S. Devados
 Middle school Coordinator : Ms.J.Mitchelle

Notable alumni
 Jalal Agha, actor featured in the song "Mehbooba Mehbooba " from Sholey
 Mahesh Kothare, actor and director of Marathi films.
 Nasser Hussain, Captain of India national rugby union team
 Abbas Tyrewala, Film director and writer

References

Catholic secondary schools in India
Primary schools in India
Christian schools in Maharashtra
High schools and secondary schools in Mumbai